The Piaggio P.2 was an Italian fighter prototype of advanced design built by Piaggio in 1923.

Design and development
In 1923, the Pegna-Bonmartini workshops at Sestri Ponente in Genoa, Italy, were constructing a fighter aircraft prototype designed by Ing Giovanni Pegna around the smallest airframe that could accommodate the 224-kilowatt (300-horsepower) Hispano-Suiza HS 42 eight-cylinder water-cooled engine. After the Piaggio company purchased Pegna-Bonmartini that year, construction of the prototype continued and resulted later in 1923 in the completion of the Piaggio P.2.

The P.2 was an aerodynamically clean, single-seat, low-wing, cantilever monoplane of very advanced design for the time with either a monocoque or semi-monocoque fuselage and fixed landing gear. It was built of wood, with plywood skin and fabric-covered control surfaces, and was armed with two machine guns—sources differ on whether the machine guns were of 7.62-millimeter (0.3-inch) or 12.7-millimeter (0.5-inch) caliber—synchronized to fire through the propeller. It had two radiators, one mounted on each side of the fuselage, forward of the open cockpit.

Operational history

Piaggio built two P.2 prototypes and entered the P.2 in the 1923 Italian official fighter contest. The P.2 was probably ahead of its time, however; the Italian Air Ministry distrusted monoplanes at the time and the P.2s performance did not meet the level that Pegna had predicted, and for these reasons no production order followed. However, the Regia Aeronautica (Italian Royal Air Force) purchased one of the prototypes for evaluation, taking delivery of it on 23 March 1924.

Operators

Regia Aeronautica

Specifications

Notes:
Time to 1,000 m (3,280 ft): 3 min 18 sec

Notes

References

 Green, William, and Gordon Swanborough. The Complete Book of Fighters: An Illustrated Encyclopedia of Every Fighter Aircraft Built and Flown. New York: SMITHMARK Publishers, 1994. .

P.002
1920s Italian fighter aircraft
Aircraft first flown in 1923